Latta Creek is a tributary stream of Salado Creek in the Diablo Range in Stanislaus County, California. Its mouth is at its confluence with Salado Creek. The creek is named for Eli C. Latta, a pioneer that came to California during the California Gold Rush and homesteaded the headwaters of the creek.

References 

Rivers of Stanislaus County, California
Diablo Range